Zabrus puncticeps is a species of ground beetle in the Polysitus subgenus that is endemic to Algeria.

References

Beetles described in 1864
Beetles of Asia
Beetles of Europe
Zabrus
Taxa named by Hermann Rudolph Schaum